Ansell's wood mouse (Hylomyscus anselli) is a species of rodent in the genus Hylomyscus. It was described in 1979.

References
Carleton, M.D.; Stanley, W.T. 2005. Review of the Hylomyscus denniae complex (Rodentia: Muridae) in Tanzania, with a description of a new species. Proceedings of the Biological Society of Washington

Hylomyscus
Mammals described in 1979